William Gregory (fl. 1406–1414) of Surrey was an English politician.

Nothing is recorded of his family.

He was a Member (MP) of the Parliament of England for Guildford in 1406.

References

Year of birth missing
15th-century deaths
English MPs 1406
People from Guildford